The governor of Benue state leads the executive branch. He appoints heads of the state ministries. He is also the chief security officer of the state. The current governor is Samuel Ortom. This is a list of administrators and governors of Benue State. 
Benue State of Nigeria was formed on 03 February 1976 when Benue-Plateau State was divided into Benue and Plateau states.

References

Benue